Rostislav Aleksandrovich Vorobyov (born 21 March 1998) is a Russian football player.

Club career
He made his debut in the Russian Football National League for FC Yenisey Krasnoyarsk on 20 July 2019 in a game against FC Rotor Volgograd.

References

External links
 Profile by Russian Football National League
 
 

1998 births
Sportspeople from Krasnoyarsk
Living people
Russian footballers
Association football defenders
FC Yenisey Krasnoyarsk players